The 2022–23 Women's FIH Pro League is the fourth edition of the Women's FIH Pro League, a field hockey championship for women's national teams. The tournament began in November 2022 and will finish in July 2023.

Format
The home and away principle will be kept, however the season will be divided into date blocks. To assist with competition planning, international and national, several teams will gather in on venue to contest “mini-tournaments," wherein they each play two matches against one another.

If one of the two matches played between two teams is cancelled, the winner of the other match will receive double points.

Teams
Following their withdrawal in the 2021–22 season due to COVID-19 related travel requirements, the national teams of Australia and New Zealand will rejoin for the new season.

Squads

Results

Standings

Fixtures
All times are local.

Goalscorers

References

External links

Women's FIH Pro League
FIH Pro League
FIH Pro League
Current field hockey seasons